Bury Me Alive is the third studio album by American metalcore band Inhale Exhale.

Track listing
 "Rooms" - 3:23 
 "Did You Ever Have A Touch To Lose?" - 3:12
 "Condemned" - 3:50
 "Over And Out" - 3:52 
 "A Dark Place For Your Mind To Be" - 4:12
 "Intentions" - 3:52
 "Explosions" - 3:56 
 "Fiction" - 3:54
 "Better Her Than Me" - 3:31
 "Thin Black Lines" - 2:02 
 "An Era" - 3:08

Personnel 
 Ryland Raus - Lead Vocals
 John LaRussa - Lead Guitar 
 Chris Carroll - Drums, Percussion 
 Greg Smith - Bass

References

2009 albums
Inhale Exhale albums
Solid State Records albums
Albums produced by Travis Wyrick